Sao Hai is a district (amphoe) in Saraburi province, central Thailand.

History
In 1549, King Chakkraphat ordered the separation of Mueang Lopburi and Nakhon Nayok to create Mueang Saraburi. The first record of a central district office is in Sao Hai at Tambon Sala Li Lao. The Mueang Saraburi office was moved to Tambon Pak Phriaw, Mueang Saraburi district in 1896. At the same time, the Sao Hai district office was moved to Tambon Suan Dokmai. Three years later  it was moved again to Tambon Sao Hai near Chao Poo Shrine. In 1924 the owner of Sao Hai fresh market donated 12,800 m2 of land about 500 m from the old location to build a new district office and police station for the district.

The name of the district means 'crying pillar', which originates from a local legend. At the time the city pillar of Bangkok was built, the king asked for the most beautiful pillars from all over the country to be sent to the capital. The one sent from Saraburi was nearly perfect, but it arrived after a pillar had been chosen and thus was only made a secondary pillar. The pillar became very sad, floated back to Saraburi on the Chao Phraya and Pa Sak Rivers, and sunk there. Later villagers heard the wails and erected the pillar there, which gave the tambon and thus the district its name. It is now in the Chao Mae Takhian Tong Shrine within the Wat Sung Temple, near the district office of Sao Hai District.

Geography
Neighbouring districts are (from the northwest clockwise) Ban Mo, Phra Phutthabat, Chaloem Phra Kiat, Mueang Saraburi, and Nong Saeng of Saraburi Province; and Tha Ruea of Phra Nakhon Si Ayutthaya province.

The main river of the district is the Pa Sak River.

Administration 
The district is divided into 12 sub-districts (tambon), which are further subdivided into 103 villages (muban). There are three townships (thesaban tambon): Sao Hai and Ban Yang each cover parts of the same-named tambon, Suan Dok Mai covers tambon Suan Dok Mai. There are a further 12 tambon administrative organizations (TAO).

References

Sao Hai